Ian Carr-Harris  (born 1941) is a Canadian artist living in Toronto. In addition to exhibiting internationally, Carr-Harris is a professor at the Ontario College of Art and Design.

Life

Ian Carr-Harris was born in Victoria, British Columbia in 1941. He is an artist, writer and educator. Major solo exhibitions of his work have taken place across Canada and abroad. His writings on art have been published in Canadian Art, Parachute, C Magazine and Vanguard, among others.

Carr-Harris has been on the faculty of the Ontario College of Art & Design since 1964. He has received several grants from the Ontario Arts Council and the Canada Council, and is currently represented by the Susan Hobbs Gallery, Toronto. He has represented Canada at the Sydney Biennale (1990), Documenta 8 (1987) and the Venice Biennale (1984).

Ian Carr-Harris currently lives and works in Toronto, and is on the Board of Directors of the CCCA. In 2002, he received the Victor Martyn Lynch-Staunton Award from the Canada Council. In 2007 he was awarded the Governor General's Award in Visual and Media Arts. He is a member of the Royal Canadian Academy of Arts.

Work

Primarily a sculptor and installation artist, Ian Carr-Harris' work investigates knowledge and ordering systems, often working with books and libraries, reflecting his early training and career as a librarian. In particular, his work reflects an interest in the intersections between memory and technology, often outmoded technology, which was a recurrent motif of Canadian art in the 1970s. Art historian Mark Cheetham describe's Carr-Harris' 1972 installation Nancy Higginson, 1949-  as a key example of work at that time which posits viewers "as forgetful machines who must have [their] memories [their] sense of [themselves] as existing over time constantly restored." In Nancy Higginson, 1949- Carr-Harris

"defines" this woman through a primitive memory system, the card catalogue, a textual archive in which the photo of Higginson seems out of place, dominated as it (and so much of our lives) is by language.

In his work Carr-Harris often uses common materials and objects, such as tables and cabinets, which are "domestic in scale, almost banal in appearance, [that] initially present their information through texts." Typical of his work in the 1970s and 1980s is a matter-of-fact revealing of the basic elements of the work to the viewer. Where the earlier works show the elements of the entire piece as banal, with text as the only key to the overall work, by the 1990s his work begins to use light projections and the 1994 installation 137 Tecumseth is one of several which artificially "re-enact the passage of sunlight through time across a particular space."

References

Notes

Further reading
 Adler, Dan. "Ian Carr-Harris: Susan Hobbs". artforum.com, 4 April 2009. http://data.logograph.com/SusanHobbs/docs/Document/193/carr-harris_artforum_2009-04-04.pdf
 Ammann, Jean-Christophe. Kanadische Kunstler. Basel, Switzerland: Kunsthalle Basel, 1978.
 Bradley, Jessica. Ian Carr-Harris/Liz Magor: Canada, XLI Biennale di Venezia. Ottawa: National Gallery of Canada, 1984.
 Cheetham, Mark. Remembering Post-Modernism: Trends in Recent Canadian Art. Toronto: OUP, 1992.  (Full text).
 Monk, Philip. Ian Carr-Harris 1971-1977. Toronto: Art Gallery of Ontario, 1988.
 Monk, Philip and Antonio Guzman. Ian Carr-Harris: Works 1992-2002. Toronto: The Power Plant, 2002.
 Murray, Joan. Canadian Art in the Twentieth Century. Toronto: Dundurn Press, 1999.
 Newlands, Anne. Canadian Art from its Beginnings to 2000. Toronto: Firefly Books, 2000.
 Youngs, Christopher. Ian Carr-Harris. Kassel: Documenta 8, vol. 2, 1987.

External links
Susan Hobbs Gallery
The Canadian Art Database
Carr-Harris at The Canadian Encyclopedia

1941 births
Living people
Canadian sculptors
Canadian male sculptors
Canadian installation artists
Artists from Victoria, British Columbia
OCAD University alumni
Members of the Royal Canadian Academy of Arts
Canadian contemporary artists
Canadian conceptual artists
Governor General's Award in Visual and Media Arts winners